S.A.D. Villaverde San Andrés, formerly Sociedad Recreativa Villaverde Boetticher Club de Fútbol, is a Spanish professional football club based in the District of Villaverde in the city of Madrid, Community of Madrid.

History
The S.R. Villaverde Boetticher C.F. was founded in 1988 when S.R. Villaverde C.F. merged with SR Boetticher y Navarro, a club founded by the Company Boetticher.

In 2017, it was renamed S.A.D. Villaverde San Andrés.

In May 2019 Jose Maria Ramos Caro was appointed manager of the club.

Season to season

Boetticher (1948–1988)

9 seasons in Tercera División

Villaverde (1971–1988)

Villaverde Boetticher

8 seasons in Tercera División

Villaverde San Andrés

2 seasons in Tercera División

Uniform

Home kit: Green shirt, white shorts, green socks.
Away kit: Black shirt, black shorts, black socks.
Sports brand: Adidas

Stadium 

Name:Boetticher. 
Capacity: 5,000 spectators. 
Inauguration: -- 
Dimensions: 105 x 65

Notable players
 Enmy Peña
 Eloy
 Jhon Epam
 Andrés Malango
 Donato Malango
 Javier del Pino
 Borja García
 Josep Gómes

References

External links
Official website
Futmadrid profile

Villaverde (Madrid)
Football clubs in Madrid
Divisiones Regionales de Fútbol clubs
Association football clubs established in 1988
1988 establishments in Spain